This is a list of episodes in the Negima! anime series, its remake, Negima!?, and the live-action adaptation Negima!!.

Negima! episodes

Negima!? episodes
This section contains a list describing the episodes of the anime series Negima!?  All of the episode titles in this series are treated as a quote (or set of quotes) by one or more of the characters in the series. The main English episode titles given below are the official ones as they were released. Some of the episode minor titles, however, are approximate translations of their literal titles.

The series was directed by Akiyuki Shinbo and Shin Oonuma, and Kenichi Kanemaki wrote the series composition. Kazuhiro Oota (SHAFT) designed the characters, and Kei Haneoka composed the music. Oota and Noboru Jitsuhara (Studio Pastoral) served as the chief animation directors, with Kuniaki Masuda joining them for episode 25. Several episodes were produced outside of Shaft: episodes 4, 7, 11, 15, 18, 21, and 24 to Studio Pastoral; episode 9 to Studio Ururu; episode 16 to Asread; episode 22 to A-Line; and episode 25 to Feel.

Magister Negi Magi: Mahō Sensei Negima!! episodes
This section lists the episode titles of the live action series version Magister Negi Magi: Mahō Sensei Negima!!

Notes

Negima
Negima!